Fujiwara (written: 藤原 lit. "Wisteria field") is a Japanese surname. Notable people with the surname include:

 Families
 The Fujiwara clan and its members
 Fujiwara no Kamatari
 Fujiwara no Fuhito
 Fujiwara no Michinaga
 Northern Fujiwara clan
 Fujiwara no Kiyohira

 Art and entertainment
 Fujiwara (owarai), Japanese comedy duo (kombi) consisting of Toshifumi Fujimoto (藤本 敏史) and Takayuki Haranishi (原西 孝幸)
, Japanese photographer
 Harry Fujiwara (Mr. Fuji) (1934 - 2016), Japanese-American wrestler
, Japanese musician, trendsetter, producer, and designer
, Japanese actor
, Japanese actress and film director
, Japanese voice actor
, lead singer and composer for the Japanese rock band Bump of Chicken
, Japanese beauty queen, model and actress
, Japanese actor
, Japanese video game designer
, Japanese actor and professional wrestler
, Japanese tenor singer

 Science
, Japanese mathematician and essayist
, Japanese mathematician and historian of mathematics
, Japanese meteorologist

 Politicians
, Japanese nurse and politician
 René Fujiwara (born 1984), Mexican politician

 Sports
, Japanese shogi player
, Japanese tennis player
, Japanese ice hockey player
, Japanese judoka
, Japanese kickboxer

Fictional characters
 Toki Fujiwara, a character of Code: Breaker
 Hazuki Fujiwara (Reanne Griffith), character of Ojamajo Doremi (Magical DoReMi)
 Fujiwara-no-Sai, character of Hikaru no Go
 Zakuro Fujiwara, character of Tokyo Mew Mew
 Fujiwara no Takamichi, character of Harukanaru Toki no Naka de
 Fujiwara no Yukitaka, character of Harukanaru Toki no Naka de 2
 Fujiwara, character of Haruhi Suzumiya
 Chiyoko Fujiwara, main character of Millennium Actress
 Fujiwara no Mokou, a character of Touhou Project
 Fujiwara Chika, character of Kaguya-sama: Love Is War
 Takumi Fujiwara, character of Initial D
 Mitsuki Kiko Fujiwara, a character of Quotev

See also
 Fujiwara-kyō, an ancient Imperial capital of Japan, corresponding to modern-day Kashihara, Nara
 The Fujiwhara effect (in weather)
 Fujiwara, a former town in Mie Prefecture.

Japanese-language surnames